The second-parent adoption or co-parent adoption is a process by which a partner, who is not biologically related to the child, can adopt their partner's biological or adoptive child without terminating the first legal parent's rights. This process is of interest to many couples, as legal parenthood allows the parent's partner to do things such as: make medical decisions, claim dependency, or gain custody in the event of the death of the biological parent.

Second-parent adoption is of significant importance in the context of the LGBT adoption. In the United States, second-parent adoption was started by the National Center for Lesbian Rights (formerly the Lesbian Rights Project) in the mid-1980s. The NCLR offers a legal guide that covers the basics of second-parent adoption. According to the NCLR, second parent adoption is the most common means by which LGBT non-biological parents establish a legal relationship with their child.

Family law varies from state to state in America. Courts in many states have granted second-parent adoptions to same-sex couples, though there is no statewide law or court decision that guarantees this. In fact, courts within the same state but in different jurisdictions often contradict each other in practice. According to the NCLR, it is legally advisable for LGBTQ+ parents to get an adoption or parentage judgment to ensure that their parental rights are fully protected in every state.

The American Medical Association supported second parent adoption by same-sex partner, stating that lack of formal recognition can cause health-care disparities for children of same-sex parents. The American Academy of Pediatrics also supports second parent adoption. The American Academy of Child and Adolescent Psychiatry has started that they oppose all discrimination based on sexual orientation or gender identity regarding custodial, foster, or adoptive rights. The American Bar Association supports second parent adoptions by unmarried persons and it is the best interest of the child.

Countries other than America similarly support second-parent adoption. In July 2011, The Ministry of Labour, Family and Social Affairs of Slovenia stated that the existing law allows for second-parent adoption. In the context of LGBT adoption and parenting in Australia, As of 2008, the best option was to apply to the Family Court of Australia for a parenting order, as ‘other people significant to the care, welfare and development’ of the child. It provides an important "status quo" if the birth mother were to die, preventing other family members from taking immediate custody of the child.

An adoption home study must be completed for any second-parent wanting to adopt. The adoption home study process ensures that the child is placed in a home that will best suit their needs. This process is dependent upon the state in which the adoption will take place.

United States
If second-parent adoption is not a legal option in certain counties or states, the Human Rights Campaign suggests taking precautionary steps, such as: a written custody agreement or a co-parent agreement between partners. Also suggested is gathering evidence to prove you are a family.

Note that where second parent adoption is illegal, it is illegal for both different sex and same-sex couples.

Alabama 
In 2016, in V.L. vs E.L., the Alabama Supreme Court attempted to overturn a second parent same-sex adoption that was validly granted by Georgia. The United States Supreme Court ruled that The Full Faith and Credit Clause of the Constitution requires the Alabama state courts to recognize a Georgia state court’s adoption order.

In Alabama, while there currently is no law that explicitly prohibits second-parent adoption, some courts have turned down requests to adopt a same-sex spouse’s child. According to the Family Equality Council, second parent adoptions are currently not available in Alabama.

Stepparent adoption is legal in Alabama.

Nebraska 
In Nebraska, any adult or a married couple jointly may adopt, but an unmarried couple may not.

In 2021, an unmarried lesbian couple sued Nebraska's health department for not allowing both of them to be on their son's birth certificate. The Nebraska Department of Health and Human Services denied their request. They stated that the only routes to legal parenthood are through marriage, adoption, or being biological related. According to the lawsuit filed, Nebraska case law prohibits second-parent adoption by an unmarried non-birth parent.

Stepparent adoption is legal in Nebraska.

North Carolina 
Second parent adoption is illegal in North Carolina. Married couples can jointly adopt if they've been married for 6 months or more. Individuals can adopt as well.

Stepparent adoption can only occur in North Carolina if the child's second biological parent waives their parental rights. This is only if the second biological parent is alive.

Utah 
Second parent adoption is illegal in Utah. To adopt in the state of Utah, one must either be married and have permission from their spouse or single and not living with another person. Anyone cohabitating in a non-marital sexual relationship cannot adopt in Utah. The adoptee must also be 10 years younger than the adopter.

Stepparent adoption is legal in Utah.

See also
Stepparent adoption
X and Others v Austria
LGBT adoption
Adoption home study

References

Family law
Adoption, fostering, orphan care and displacement
LGBT rights

de:Adoption#Stiefkindadoption
la:Status liberorum parentum eiusdem sexus#coadoptio